These are the international rankings of Madagascar.

International rankings

References

Madagascar